James Sugrue (born 9 December 1998) is an Irish professional golfer who played at the 2020 Masters Tournament. He qualified for the Masters by winning The Amateur Championship in 2019.

Results in major championships
Results not in chronological order in 2020.

CUT = missed the halfway cut 
NT = No tournament due to COVID-19 pandemic

References

Irish male golfers
Amateur golfers
Sportspeople from County Cork
People from Mallow, County Cork
1998 births
Living people